Bychina is a rural locality (a village) in Krasnovishersky District, Perm Krai, Russia. The population was 178 as of 2010. There are 4 streets.

Geography 
Bychina is located 35 km southeast of Krasnovishersk (the district's administrative centre) by road. Nizhnyaya Bychina is the nearest rural locality.

References 

Rural localities in Krasnovishersky District